Axoclinus rubinoffi, known commonly as Rubinoff's triplefin, is a species of triplefin blenny. This species is endemic to Malpelo Island in the eastern Pacific off Colombia. The specific name of this fish honours the American marine biologist Ira Rubinoff (b. 1938), Director of the Smithsonian Tropical Research Institute.

References

rubinoffi
Fish described in 1992